USS Otter (DE-210), a  of the United States Navy, in service from 1944 to 1947. She was finally sunk as a target in 1970.

History

USS Otter was named in honor of Lieutenant Bethel V. Otter (1914-1942), who was killed in action on Corregidor on 6 May 1942. She was laid down on 26 July 1943 by the Charleston Navy Yard; launched on 23 October 1943; sponsored by Mrs. William M. Otter, the mother of Lieutenant Otter; commissioned on 21 February 1944.

Battle of the Atlantic
Following a Bermuda shakedown, Otter joined the Atlantic Fleet and escorted two carriers to Casablanca, then, for the remainder of the year, she helped protect convoys shuttling from the United States to various Mediterranean ports. Throughout these operations not a single ship was lost.

In December 1944, Otter and three of her sister ships formed a task group to hunt and destroy German U-boats in the middle and north Atlantic. On 16 January 1945, without assistance from aircraft, the group located and sank . Otter, after playing a crucial role in the depth charge attack, proudly displayed a submarine silhouette on her bridge.

In April, this task group joined a large task force of destroyer escorts and escort carriers patrolling the shipping lanes of the North Atlantic and searching for submarines. During these operations, destroyer escort  was torpedoed and sunk, and while other ships of the group engaged and sank , Otter assisted in the rescue of survivors.

Upon the end of the war in Europe, Otter was one of the ships assigned to accept the surrender of German submarines. She intercepted a U-boat east of Newfoundland, put a boarding party on board, and escorted the submarine, the second to surrender, over a thousand miles to the East Coast of the United States.

Otter then began to refit for the Pacific War. The end of hostilities changed plans and Otter was assigned to the Naval Submarine Base New London, Connecticut, to assist in submarine training.

Fate
By directive dated January 1947, Otter was placed out of commission, in reserve, attached to the United States Atlantic Reserve Fleet and berthed in Florida. She was finally sunk as target off Puerto Rico on 10 July 1970.

Awards 
Otter received one battle star for service in World War II.

References

External links

 

Buckley-class destroyer escorts
World War II frigates and destroyer escorts of the United States
Ships built in Charleston, South Carolina
1943 ships